The year 1876 in archaeology involved some significant events.

Excavations
 Mycenae by Heinrich Schliemann.

Finds
 The "Mask of Agamemnon" found at Mycenae by Heinrich Schliemann. Later in the year Schliemann supposedly telegraphs a Greek newspaper "I have gazed on the face of Agamemnon".
 October - Excavations by John Clayton in Coventina's Well at Carrawburgh on Hadrian's Wall yield at least 13,400 Roman coins.

Publications
 Amelia Edwards - A Thousand Miles up the Nile.

Births
 March 19 - John Marshall, English Director-General of the Archaeological Survey of India (died 1958).
 May 5 - John Garstang, English archaeologist of the Near East (died 1956).

Deaths
 August 19 - George Smith, English Assyriologist (born 1840)

See also
Ancient Egypt / Egyptology

References

Archaeology
Archaeology by year
Archaeology
Archaeology